Yasin Kocatepe (born 8 September 1991) is a German professional footballer who last played for Altınordu. He made his Süper Lig debut on 11 May 2013.

References

External links
 
 
 

1991 births
Living people
People from Fulda (district)
Sportspeople from Kassel (region)
German people of Turkish descent
German footballers
Orduspor footballers
Altınordu F.K. players
Süper Lig players
SC Paderborn 07 players
2. Bundesliga players
SC Pfullendorf players
Association football midfielders
Footballers from Hesse
German expatriate footballers
German expatriate sportspeople in Turkey
Expatriate footballers in Turkey